Kari Corbett (born 16 February 1984) is a Scottish actress, artist and filmmaker. Corbett is perhaps best known for portraying Ruby Hepburn in Channel 4 comedy drama Shameless, Nurse Marian McKaig in ITV's The Royal, Sarah in the BAFTA award-winning Jeopardy, Kirsty in David Mackenzie's film, You Instead, and Jean McGrory in CBC's comedy Mr. D. Kari was nominated for The Johnny Walker Great Scot Award for Outstanding Contribution to Entertainment in 2011, and selected as one of the 12 Rising Stars of 2012 by the Radio Times. Kari has produced two award nominated short-films, screened at The Chicago Underground Film Festival, and The Glasgow Film Festival.

Career
Corbett began acting at the age of 17, playing Sarah in Jeopardy. She recently appeared in the comedy series Mr. D, Rubenesque, and Case Histories for BBC. Her other work includes Shameless, The Royal, You Instead, Monarch of the Glen,  River City, The Inspector Lynley Mysteries, "Katie Morag" and Sea of Souls.

Radio Times named Corbett one of the 12 Rising Stars of 2012. Kari was nominated for The Johnny Walker Blue Label Great Scot award in 2011, for Outstanding Contribution to the Entertainment. Her first experimental video, Uncontrollable Joy For Life (2010), has been screened in various film festivals such as the 2011 Chicago Underground Film Festival. She produced, directed, and starred in the experimental short film If Only I Was Simone De Beauvoir (2011), which was nominated for "Best International Short Film" at the Glasgow Film Festival.

Corbett also appeared as Evie Watt  in Shetland on BBC 1 in 2014.

Personal life
Corbett studied at the Glasgow School of Art and the School of the Art Institute of Chicago, focusing on performance art and filmmaking. She graduated in 2011.

Awards

Filmography

Film

Television

References

External links

12 rising stars of 2012

1984 births
Living people
Actresses from Paisley, Renfrewshire
Scottish film actresses
Scottish television actresses
Artists from Paisley, Renfrewshire
21st-century Scottish actresses